Louie (Didou in the original French) is an animation television series produced by the French company Millimages, created by Isabeau Merle, adapted from the work of Yves Got and directed by Frédéric Mege, Frédérick Chaillou & François Narboux. The series has been broadcast on France 5 in Zouzous, Nickelodeon, Super RTL, Discovery Kids Latin America, Disney Channel, ABC, CITV and CBeebies.

The English voice cast features Emma Tate as Louie, Shelley Longworth as Sophie, Sue Elliott Nicholls and Matt Wilkinson as additional drawings, and The Hot Kool Kids as offscreen speakers.

In 2019, the Millimages studio announced the production of a new Didou series: Didou, Construis-Moi! which will be available in Spring 2020 on the Okoo platform of France Télévisions.

Episodes

Series 1 
 Louie, Draw Me a House (12 February 2006)
 Louie, Draw Me a Snail (13 February 2006)
 Louie, Draw Me a Camel (14 February 2006)
 Louie, Draw Me a Dog (15 February 2006)
 Louie, Draw Me a Flower (16 February 2006)
 Louie, Draw Me a Rhinoceros (17 February 2006)
 Louie, Draw Me a Penguin (19 February 2006)
 Louie, Draw Me a Dolphin (20 February 2006)
 Louie, Draw Me a Car (21 February 2006)
 Louie, Draw Me a Boat (22 February 2006)
 Louie, Draw Me a Dragon (23 February 2006) 
 Louie, Draw Me a Robot (24 February 2006)
 Louie, Draw Me a Rocket (26 February 2006)
 Louie, Draw Me an Ostrich (27 February 2006)
 Louie, Draw Me a Crocodile (28 February 2006) 
 Louie, Draw Me a Sheep (1 March 2006) 
 Louie, Draw Me a Horse (2 March 2006)
 Louie, Draw Me a Slide (5 March 2006) 
 Louie, Draw Me an Aeroplane (6 March 2006)
 Louie, Draw Me a Cow (7 March 2006)
 Louie, Draw Me a Chameleon (8 March 2006)
 Louie, Draw Me a Kangaroo (9 March 2006 
 Louie, Draw Me an Elephant (12 March 2006)
 Louie, Draw Me a Hot-Air Balloon (13 March 2006) 
 Louie, Draw Me a Fire Engine (14 March 2006)
 Louie, Draw Me a Beaver (15 March 2006) 
 Louie, Draw Me a Frog (16 March 2006) 
 Louie, Draw Me a Squirrel (19 March 2006) 
 Louie, Draw Me a Tree (20 March 2006) 
 Louie, Draw Me a Cake (21 March 2006) 
 Louie, Draw Me a Castle (22 March 2006)
 Louie, Draw Me a Sea Lion (23 March 2006) 
 Louie, Draw Me a Pelican (25 March 2006) 
 Louie, Draw Me a Piano (26 March 2006) 
 Louie, Draw Me a Reindeer (27 March 2006)
 Louie, Draw Me a Monkey (28 March 2006)
 Louie, Draw Me a Lion (29 March 2006)
 Louie, Draw Me a Tractor (30 March 2006)
 Louie, Draw Me a Train (2 April 2006)

Series 2
 Louie, Draw Me a Butterfly (10 February 2007)
 Louie, Draw Me a Pig (11 February 2007)
 Louie, Draw Me a Tow Truck (12 February 2007)
 Louie, Draw Me a Scarecrow (13 February 2007)
 Louie, Draw Me a Parrot (14 February 2007)
 Louie, Draw Me a Giraffe (17 February 2007)
 Louie, Draw Me a Hippopotamus (18 February 2007)
 Louie, Draw Me a Lighthouse (19 February 2007)
 Louie, Draw Me a Sledge (20 February 2007)
 Louie, Draw Me a Mouse (21 February 2007)
 Louie, Draw Me a Crane (24 February 2007)
 Louie, Draw Me a Submarine (25 February 2007)
 Louie, Draw Me a Koala (26 February 2007)
 Louie, Draw Me a Wolf (27 February 2007)
 Louie, Draw Me an Owl (28 February 2007)
 Louie, Draw Me a Whale (3 March 2007)
 Louie, Draw Me a Crab (4 March 2007)
 Louie, Draw Me a Flying Saucer (5 March 2007)
 Louie, Draw Me a Helicopter (6 March 2007) 
 Louie, Draw Me a Wheelbarrow (7 March 2007)
 Louie, Draw Me a Merry-go-round (10 March 2007)
 Louie, Draw Me an Octopus (11 March 2007)
 Louie, Draw Me an Ibex (12 March 2007)
 Louie, Draw Me a Dinosaur (13 March 2007)
 Louie, Draw Me a Flamingo (14 March 2007)
 Louie, Draw Me a Pirate Ship (17 March 2007)
 Louie, Draw Me a Yeti (18 March 2007)
 Louie, Draw Me a Cheetah (19 March 2007)
 Louie, Draw Me a Bear (20 March 2007)
 Louie, Draw Me a Mammoth (21 March 2007)
 Louie, Draw Me a Coach (24 March 2007)
 Louie, Draw Me a Stagecoach (25 March 2007)
 Louie, Draw Me a Stalk (26 March 2007)
 Louie, Draw Me a Cat (27 March 2007)
 Louie, Draw Me a Polecat (28 March 2007)
 Louie, Draw Me a Mole (31 March 2007)
 Louie, Draw Me a Ghost (1 April 2007)
 Louie, Draw Me a Witch (2 April 2007)

Series 3
 Louie, Draw Me a Pigeon (15 February 2008)
 Louie, Draw Me a Loch Ness Monster (16 February 2008)
 Louie, Draw Me a Narwhale (17 February 2008)
 Louie, Draw Me an Igloo (18 February 2008)
 Louie, Draw Me an Eagle (19 February 2008)
 Louie, Draw Me a Spider (22 February 2008)
 Louie, Draw Me a Pirate (23 February 2008)
 Louie, Draw Me a Peacock (24 February 2008)
 Louie, Draw Me a Tepee (25 February 2008)
 Louie, Draw Me a Cockerel (26 February 2008)
 Louie, Draw Me a Clown (1 March 2008)
 Louie, Draw Me a Magpie (2 March 2008)
 Louie, Draw Me a Saint-Bernard (3 March 2008) 
 Louie, Draw Me an Otter (4 March 2008)
 Louie, Draw Me a Spectacled Cobra (5 March 2008)
 Louie, Draw Me a Fairy (8 March 2008)
 Louie, Draw Me a Scooter (9 March 2008)
 Louie, Draw Me a Hang-glider (10 March 2008)
 Louie, Draw Me a Panda (11 March 2008)
 Louie, Draw Me a Tiger (12 March 2008)
 Louie, Draw Me a Shark (15 March 2008)
 Louie, Draw Me an Elf (16 March 2008)
 Louie, Draw Me a Tortoise (17 March 2008)
 Louie, Draw Me a Donkey (18 March 2008)
 Louie, Draw Me a Liner (19 March 2008)
 Louie, Draw Me an Antelope (21 March 2008)
 Louie, Draw Me a Police Car (22 March 2008)
 Louie, Draw Me a Christmas Tree (23 March 2008)
 Louie, Draw Me a Hedgehog (24 March 2008)
 Louie, Draw Me an Ambulance (25 March 2008)
 Louie, Draw Me a Llama (26 March 2008)
 Louie, Draw Me a Dustbin Lorry (29 March 2008)
 Louie, Draw Me a Digger (30 March 2008)
 Louie, Draw Me a Hovercraft (31 March 2008)
 Louie, Draw Me an Ogre (1 April 2008)
 Louie, Draw Me a Brown Bat (2 April 2008)
 Louie, Draw Me a Genie (5 April 2008) 
 Louie, Draw Me a Caravan (6 April 2008)
 Louie, Draw Me a Marmot (7 April 2008)

Specials
 Louie and Santa's Assistant (19 April 2022)
 Louie and the Rainbow Fairy (10 October 2022)

Crew
 Directors : Frédéric Mège, Frédérick Chaillou], François Narboux
 Producers : Roch Lener, Jonathan Peel, Marie-Caroline Villand
 Head of production : Marc Dhrami, Antoine Vimal, Séverine Modzelewski
 1st assistants : Yann Popelier, Caroline Audebert
 Music : Eduardo Makaroff, Paul Lazar, Shawn Lee
 Storyboarders : Pierre Cerruti, Wilson Dos Santos, Mohamed Labidi, Eric Gosselet, Michael Armellino
 Background Artists : Nicolas Viegeolat, Eric Gosselet, Delphine Huard, Pascal Badin
 Head of animation : François Narboux
 Animation : Capucine Latrasse, Christophe Calissoni, Barbara Maleville, Marie-Hélène Vernerie, Graziella Petrini, Sophie Dupont, Laetitia Dupont, Stéphane Cronier, Christophe N'Guyen, Maeva Saiz, Vang Xiong, Yannick Zanchetta
 Editing : Alain Lavallé, Thibaud Caquot
 Sound design : Bruno Guéraçague
 Sound mix : Bruno Mercère

References

External links
 
 Official website (Millimages)

2000s French animated television series
French television shows based on children's books
2006 French television series debuts
Animated television series about children
Animated television series about rabbits and hares
France Télévisions children's television series
CBeebies
French preschool education television series
Animated preschool education television series
2000s preschool education television series
 
French-language television shows
English-language television shows